Gregory Greene may refer to:

 Greg Greene, a 1997 Alberta Social Credit Party candidate for the Calgary-Nose Creek provincial electoral district
 Gregory Greene, Toronto-based director of 2004 documentary film The End of Suburbia